This is a list of an approximate rendering of the names of the village-level divisions of the province of Hubei, People's Republic of China (PRC) into a romanized form derived from Standard Mandarin Pinyin. After province, prefecture, county-level divisions, and township-level divisions, village-level divisions constitute the formal fifth-level administrative divisions of the PRC.  This list is divided first into the prefecture-level, then the county-level divisions, then township-level divisions.

Wuhan

Caidian District
Subdistricts:

Caidian Subdistrict, Zhashan Subdistrict, Yong'an Subdistrict, Zhurushan Subdistrict, Daji Subdistrict, Zhangwan Subdistrict, Zhuankou Avenue Subdistrict, Junshan Subdistrict

Towns:
Suohe, Yuxian

The only township is Xiaosi Township

Caidian Subdistrict
Communities:
Zhengjie Committee, Hejie, Xinfu, Sanyi, Gongnong, Mahao, Yuejinqiao, Gongjialing, Wucengjie, Maoyuan, Zhiyin, Luojiashan

Villages:
Sunjiafan, Chenggong, Majiadu, Yongli, Gaomiao, Guoli, Huali, Hualin, Yaojialin, Xiwutai, Xinmiao, Jianxin, Tongxin, Qilian, Caidian, Maolin, Hanle

Other areas:
Gaomiao Seed Stock Farm

Zhashan Subdistrict
Four communities:
 Zhashan, Zhashanxin, Xingguang, Dadong Community

Thirty-seven villages:
 Dadong Village, Xiaodong, Hongyan, Xingguang, Lianyi, Lianmeng, Qiulin, Laoshichen, Luosigang, Sanhong, Tanshu, Zhongyuan, Changxin, Xiaguang, Qianfeng, Shuangfeng, Zhashan, Conglin, Xin'anbu, Liuhuan, Yuanling, Qunyan, Dingjiu, Yizhi, Fanli, Luojia, Chenjia, Zhujia, Xinsheng, Sanjiadian, Sanyang, Minsheng, Xingli, Xinji, You'ai, Qunjian, Jinniu

Yong'an Subdistrict
Residential communities:
 Yong'an, Jiuzhenshan

Villages:
 Wanling, Yong'an, Poshu, Dongyue, Xinliu, Huayuan, Lufang, Huoyan, Tongshantou, Changzheng, Caohe, Laowan, Guji, Yanwan, Shicheng, Hongcheng, Xiangji, Baimu, Yongfeng, Gaoxin, Zhulin

Zhurushan Subdistrict
Residential communities:
Zhuru, Tanshan

Villages:
Zhuru, Yangling, Junshan, Dongshan, Tujin, Huangjin, Gaodeng, Guanling, Kuangwan, Zhafang, Tulong, Zhongwan, Yangwan, Zhongliu, Baisai, Daiwan, Hefeng, Zhoumen, Shentang, Gangzui, Hengshan, Baibao, Yumen, Masai, Laoguan, Taidu, Tielu, Tudong, Qianhu, Wugong, Shenghong, Xueshan, Jinji, Junying

Dongxihu District
Subdistricts:
Wujiashan Subdistrict, Baiquan Subdistrict, Jiangjun Road Subdistrict, Cihui Subdistrict, Zoumaling Subdistrict, Jinghe Subdistrict, Changqing Subdistrict, Xin'andu Subdistrict, Dongshan Subdistrict, Changqinghuayuan New Area Subdistrict, Xingouzhen Subdistrict, Jinyinhu Subdistrict

Hannan District
Subdistricts:
Shamao Subdistrict, Dengnan Subdistrict, Dongjing Subdistrict, Xiangkou Subdistrict

Hanyang District
Subdistricts:
Jianqiao Subdistrict, Longyang Subdistrict, Sixin Subdistrict, Qingchuan Subdistrict, Yingwu Subdistrict, Zhoutou Subdistrict, Wulidun Subdistrict, Qinduankou Subdistrict, Jianghan'erqiao Subdistrict, Yongfeng Subdistrict, Jiangdi Subdistrict
Areas:
Hanyang Economic Development Zone 汉阳经济开发区, Sixin Area 四新地区

Hongshan District
Subdistricts:
Luonan Subdistrict, Guanshan Subdistrict, Shizishan Subdistrict, Zhangjiawan Subdistrict, Liyuan Subdistrict, Zhuodaoquan Subdistrict, Hongshan Subdistrict, Heping Subdistrict, Qingling Subdistrict, Huashan Subdistrict, Zuoling Subdistrict, Jiufeng Subdistrict, Guandong Subdistrict, Jianshe Subdistrict, Donghu Scenic Area Subdistrict

The only township is Tianxing Township

Guanshan Subdistrict
Twenty-eight communities:
Haihe, Nanwang, Youkeyuan, Hudian, Qibiao, Zhongnan Caijing Zhengfa Daxue Nanhu, Zisong, Minda (- South Central University for Nationalities), Fangda (- Wuhan Textile University 武汉纺织大学), Guanshankou, Qifa, Yangguang, Yijinghuating, Guannan, Lumolu, Changjiang, Dida (- China University of Geosciences), Long'an, Kangjuyuan, Bishui, Geguang, Xuefu, Jianqiaochuntian, Baoli, Zhihuicheng, Fenglinshangcheng, Yangchun, Huazhong Keji Daxue (- Huazhong University of Science and Technology)

Shizishan Subdistrict
Thirteen subdistricts:
Huanongdong, Huanongxi, Luoshilu, Shengnongkeyuan, Tonghui, Qiyi'ersuo, Hugong, Wunantielu, Shinan, Nanhushanzhuang, Meiguiwan, Shuchenglu, Luojiayayuan

Huangpi District
Subdistricts:

Qianchuan Subdistrict, Qijiawan Subdistrict, Hengdian Subdistrict, Luohansi Subdistrict, Shekou Subdistrict, Liuzhidian Subdistrict, Tianhe Subdistrict, Wangjiahe Subdistrict, Changxuanling Subdistrict, Liji Subdistrict, Yaoji Subdistrict, Caizha Subdistrict, Wuhu Subdistrict

The only town is Sanli

Townships:
Caidian Township, Mulan Township

Jiang'an District
Subdistricts:
Dazhi Subdistrict, Yiyuan Subdistrict, Chezhan Subdistrict, Siwei Subdistrict, Yongqing Subdistrict, Xima Subdistrict, Qiuchang Subdistrict, Laodong Subdistrict, Erqi Subdistrict, Xincun Subdistrict, Danshuichi Subdistrict, Taibei Subdistrict, Huaqiao Subdistrict, Shenjiaji Subdistrict

Other Areas:

Houhu Office, Tazihu Office

Yiyuan Subdistrict
Communities:
Yuefei, Tongxing, Sanyang, Kunhou, Tianjin, Yangzi, Tongfu, Dongting

Chezhan Subdistrict (Jiang'an)
Communities:
Huaqing, Chang'an, Sande, Futang, Furen

Jianghan District
Thirteen subdistricts:
Minzu Subdistrict, Hualou Subdistrict, Shuita Subdistrict, Minquan Subdistrict, Manchun Subdistrict, Minyi Subdistrict, Xinhua Subdistrict, Wansong Subdistrict, Tangjiadun Subdistrict, Beihu Subdistrict, Qianjin Subdistrict, Changqing Subdistrict, Hanxing Subdistrict

Jiangxia District
Subdistricts:
Zhifang Subdistrict, Jinkou Subdistrict, Wulongquan Subdistrict, Zhengdian Subdistrict, Liufang Subdistrict, Wulijie Subdistrict, Jinshui Subdistrict, Anshan Subdistrict, Shanpo Subdistrict, Fozuling Subdistrict, Baoxie Subdistrict, Binhu Subdistrict

Towns:
Fasi, Husi

The only township is Shu'an Township

Qiaokou District
Eleven subdistricts:
Gutian Subdistrict, Hanjiadun Subdistrict, Zongguan Subdistrict, Hanshuiqiao Subdistrict, Baofeng Subdistrict, Ronghua Subdistrict, Hanzhong Subdistrict, Hanzheng Subdistrict, Liujiaoting Subdistrict, Changfeng Subdistrict, Yijia Subdistrict

Qingshan District
Subdistricts:
Hongwei Road Subdistrict, Yejin Subdistrict, Xingouqiao Subdistrict, Honggangcheng Subdistrict, Gongrencun Subdistrict, Qingshanzhen Subdistrict, Changqian Subdistrict, Wudong Subdistrict, Baiyushan Subdistrict, Ganghuacun Subdistrict, Gangduhuayuan Subdistrict

Other: Beihu Administrative Committee Subdistrict

Wuchang District
Fifteen subdistricts:
Jiyuqiao Subdistrict, Yangyuan Subdistrict, Xujiapeng Subdistrict, Liangdao Subdistrict, Zhonghualu Subdistrict, Huanghelou Subdistrict, Ziyang Subdistrict, Baishazhou Subdistrict, Shouyilu Subdistrict, Zhongnanlu Subdistrict, Shuiguohu Subdistrict, Luojiashan Subdistrict, Shidong Subdistrict, Nanhu Subdistrict, Donghu Scenic Area Subdistrict

Xinzhou District
Subdistricts:
Zhucheng Subdistrict, Yangluo Subdistrict, Cangbu Subdistrict, Wangji Subdistrict, Liji Subdistrict, Sandian Subdistrict, Pantang Subdistrict, Jiujie Subdistrict, Shuangliu Subdistrict, Zhangduhu Subdistrict

Towns:
Xinchong, Xugu, Fenghuang

Zhucheng Subdistrict
Twenty-two communities:
Hongqi, Nanjie, Xinjian, Wenhua, Xingfu, Dong'an, Huangmao, Zhangnan, Fenghuangtai, Qing'an, Caihao, Liuji, Xuefu, Xiangyang, Guangming, Longcheng, Chengnan, Zhanglin, Xiangdong, Chengdong, Changxin, Xiangyan

Thirty-six villages:
Chengbei, Luofan, Zhongyang, Yuyao, Longqiao, Shengying, Dengfeng, Gugang, Bashan, Hongfeng, Liuliu, Meidian, Tielong, Zhangxing, Chenghu, Yongli, Zhangcheng, Baxu, Dadu, Raocai, Chengxi, Tiejia, Chenxian, Qianzhai, Taoliu, Liuji, Xiaoqiao, Zhanhe, Wubang, Xingang, Qiuqiao, Yiyao, Donggang, Zhanqiao, Lianhe, Poyue

Other area:
Lianhe Agricultural Research Center

Enshi Tujia and Miao Autonomous Prefecture

Enshi City
Subdistricts:
Wuyangba Subdistrict, Liujiaoting Subdistrict, Xiaoduchuan Subdistrict

Towns:
Longfeng, Cuiba, Banqiao

Townships:
Sancha Township, Xintang Township, Hongtu Township, Shadi Township, Baiyangping Township, Taiyanghe Township, Tunbao Township, Baiguo Township, Bajiao Dong Ethnic Township, Shengjiaba Township

Lichuan
Subdistricts:
Duting Subdistrict, Dongcheng Subdistrict

Towns:
Moudao, Baiyangba, Wangying, Jiannan, Zhonglu, Tuanbao

Townships:
Liangwu Township, Yuanbao Township, Nanping Township, Wendou Township, Maoba Township, Shaxi Township

Zhonglu
One residential community:
Longqu

Sixty villages:
Honghua, Fanshen, Chatai, Hexin, Qilong, Shuangmiao, Guihua, Zonghe, Tianwan, Hongsha, Zhuba, Zhongling, Nongke, Xiaping, Xiaohe, Gongqiao, Yangjiapo, Xiangyang, Paomu, Xiaoping, Huilong, Dongfeng, Xiaba, Fengle, Shipan, Basheng, Longtang, Zhaipo, Muba, Jinyan, Xilin, Ganxi, Xinjian, Huangla, Fenghuang, Xinglong, Chengchi, Pianqian, Taiping, Jiangyuan, Shaping, Hujiatang, Heilin, Lizhi, Mitanxi, Laowuji, Heli, Hongling, Pingxing, Jinxiu, Liangfeng, Shuanghe, Qingping, Chenggan, Yongxing, Lishan, Minzhu, Chayuan, Shuangzhai, Jinyin

Badong County
Towns:
Badong, Dongrang/nangkou, Yanduhe, Guandukou, Chadianzi, Lücongpo, Dazhiping, Yesanguan, Shuibuya, Qingtaiping

Townships:
Xiqiuwan Township, Jinguoping Township

Hefeng County
Towns:
Zouma, Rongmei

Townships:
Tielu Township, Wuli Township, Yanzi Township, Xiaping Township, Wuyang Township, Zhongying Township, Taiping Township

Jianshi County
Towns:
Yezhou, Gaoping, Hongyansi, Jingyang, Guandian, Huaping

Townships:
Changliang Township, Maotian Township, Longping Township, Sanli Township

Laifeng County
Towns:
Xiangfeng, Baifusi, Dahe

Townships:
Lüshui Township, Manshui Township, Jiusi Township, Geleche Township, Sanhu Township

Xianfeng County
Towns:
Gaoleshan, Zhongbao, Jiamachi, Chaoyangsi, Qingping, Tangya

Townships:
Dingzhai Township, Huolongping Township, Xiaocun Township, Huangjindong Township

Xuan'en County
Towns:
Zhushan, Jiaoyuan, Shadaogou

Townships:
Wanzhai Township, Changtanhe Dong Ethnic Township, Lijiahe Township, Xiaoguan Dong Ethnic Township, Gaoluo Township, Chunmuying Township

Ezhou

Echeng District
Four subdistricts:
Fenghuang Subdistrict, Gulou Subdistrict, Xishan Subdistrict, Fankou Subdistrict

'Nine towns:'

Zelin (泽林镇)

Dushan (杜山镇)

Xinmiao (新庙镇)

Bishi

Tingzu (汀祖镇)

Yanji (燕矶镇)

Yangye (杨叶镇)

Huahu (花湖镇)

Changgang (长港镇)

Shawo Township

Ezhou Economic Development Zone (鄂州经济开发区)

Huarong District
Three towns:
Huarong, Miaoling, Duandian

Two townships:
Linjiang, Putuan

Liangzihu District
Five towns:
Taihe, Donggou, Liangzi Wildlife Management Area, Tujianao, Zhaoshan

Huanggang

Huangzhou District 
Four subdistricts:
 Chibi Subdistrict, Donghu Subdistrict, Yuwang Subdistrict, Nanhu Subdistrict

Three towns:
 Lukou, Ducheng, Chencelou

The only township is Taodian Township.

One other area:
 Railway Station Economic Development Area

Macheng 
Subdistricts:
 Longchiqoao Subdistrict, Gulou Subdistrict, Nanhu Subdistrict

Towns:
 Zhongguanyi, Songbu, Qiting, Baiguo, Fuzihe, Yanjiahe, Guishan, Yantianhe, Zhangjiafan, Muzidian, Sanhekou, Huangtugang, Futianhe, C/Shengmagang, Shunhe

The only township is Tiemengang.

One other area: Macheng Economic Development Zone

Wuxue 
Four subdistricts:
 Wuxue Subdistrict, Kanjiang Subdistrict, Tianjiazhen Subdistrict (Tianzhen), Wanzhanghu Subdistrict

Eight towns

Meichuan 
Meichuan administers:

Yuchuan (余川镇) 
Huaqiao, Dajin, Shifosi, Siwang, Dafasi, Longping

Hong'an County 
Towns:
 Chengguan, Qiliping, Huajiahe, Ercheng, Shangxinji, Gaoqiao, Mi'ersi, Baliwan, Taipingqiao, Yongjiahe

Other Areas:
 Huolianfan Tea Farm, Tiantaishan Scenic Area

Xinghua Township 
The only township is Xinghua Township

Huangmei County 
Twelve towns:
 Huangmei, Konglong, Xiaochi, Xiaxin, Dahe, Tingqian, Wuzu, Zhuogang, Caishan, Xinkai, Dushan, Fenlu

Four townships:
 Liulin Township, Shamu Township, Kuzhu Township, Liuzuo Township

Luotian County 
Ten towns:
 Fengshan, Luotuo'ao, Dahe'an, Jiuzihe, Shengli, Hepu, Sanlifan, Kuanghe (formerly a township 乡), Baimiaohe (formerly a township 乡), Daqi (formerly a township 乡)

Two townships:
 Bailianhe Township, Pinghu Township

Qichun County 
Thirteen towns:
 Caohe, Chidong, Qizhou, Guanyao, Pengsi, Hengche, Zhulin, Liuhe, Shizi, Qingshi, Zhangbang, Datong, Tanlin

The only township is Xiangqiao Township

One other area: Balihu

Tuanfeng County 
Eight towns:
 Tuanfeng, Linshanhe, Fanggaoping, Huilongshan, Macaomiao, Shangbahe, Zongluzui, Dandian

Two townships:
 Gu/Jiamiao Township, Dupi Township

Xishui County 
Twelve towns:
 Qingquan, Bahe, Zhuwa, Wanggang, Tuanpi, Guankou, Bailian, Caihe, Xianma, Dingsidang, Sanhua, Lanxi

The only township is Lüyang Township

Three other areas: Sanjiaoshan Forestry Area, Cehu Breeding Farm, Xishui Economic Development Zone

Yingshan County 
Eight towns:

Wenquan (温泉镇)
Communities:
Bisheng 毕升社区, Dongmen 东门社区, Jiming 鸡鸣社区, Lingyuan 陵园社区, Chengbei 城北社区
Villages
Lianhua 莲花村, Baishi'ao 白石坳村, Po'ernao 坡儿垴村, Xitanghe 西汤河村, Beitanghe 北汤河村, Huayuan 花园村, Gantang'ao 甘塘坳村, Maqian 马堑村, Danaozhai 大垴寨村, Jiangjunshan 将军山村, Shanxi'ao 山溪坳村, Jinjiaqiao 金家桥村, Xiaomifan 小米畈村, Meijiayan 梅家岩村, Doumifan 斗米畈村, Liulinhe 柳林河村, Shelongjian 蛇龙尖村, Majia'ao 马家坳村, Yangshugou 杨树沟村, Huangboshan 黄柏山村, Baijianhe 百笕河村, Fengshupai 枫树排村, Chenhe 陈河村, Shangma'ao 上马坳村, Ma'anzhai 马鞍寨村, Maocao'ao 茅草坳村, Baizhanghe 百丈河村, Xieshuiyan 泻水岩村, Yitianmen 一天门村, Heishitou 黑石头村, Longtanfan 龙潭畈村, Qiliyan 七里岩村, Shawanhe 沙塆河村, Taofang 陶坊村, Chishuichong 赤水冲村, Zhaojiafan 赵家畈村, Shimenchong 石门冲村, Pengfan 彭畈村, Baishuci 柏树祠村, Huangzhushan 黄竹山村, Xiabeichong 下贝冲村, Xichong  西冲村, Tafan 塔畈村, Qiangjiawan 羌家塆村, Chongshanpu || 崇山铺村, Jilinggou 季陵沟村, Shucai 蔬菜村, Jiulongkou 九垄口村, Nanchongfan 南冲畈村.

Nanhe (南河镇)

Hongshan (红山镇)

Jinjiapu (金家铺镇)

Shitouju (石头咀镇)

Caopandi (草盘地镇)

Leijiadian (雷家店镇)

Yangliuwan (杨柳湾镇)

Three townships:

Fangjiaju Township (方家咀乡)

Kongjiafang Township (孔家坊乡)

Taojiahe Township (陶家河乡)

Four other areas:
Taohuachong Forestry Area, Wujiashan Forestry Area, Wufengshan Forestry Area, Yingshan County Economic Development District

Huangshi

Huangshigang District
Subdistricts:
Shenjiaying Subdistrict, Huangshigang Subdistrict, Hongqiqiao Subdistrict, Shengyanggang Subdistrict, Huahu Subdistrict

Tieshan District
The only administrative direct subdivision is a town-simulating village.

Xialu District
The only subdistrict is Tuanchengshan Subdistrict

Xisaishan District
Subdistricts:
Linjiang Subdistrict, Baquan Subdistrict, Chenjiawan Subdistrict, Chengyue Subdistrict, Huangsiwan Subdistrict, Xisaishan Subdistrict

The only town is Hekou

Daye
Subdistricts:
Dongyue Road Subdistrict, Jinhu Subdistrict, Luojiaqiao Subdistrict, Jinshan Subdistrict

Towns:
 Jinniu, Bao'an, Lingxiang, Jinshandian, Haidiqiao, Yinzu, Liurenba, Chengui, Dajipu, Wangren

The only township is Mingshan Township

Jinshan Subdistrict (金山街道)
Communities 
四棵, 王太, 鹏程, 金山
Villages
金山, 宝山, 钟山, 圣水泉, 路平, 鹏程, 王坛, 大路, 四棵, 新农, 明港, 王太, 张冲, 路东

Yangxin County
Towns:
Xingguo, Fuchi, Huangsangkou, Weiyuankou, Taizi, Dawang, Taogang, Baisha, Futu, Sanxi, Yanggang, Paishi, Mugang, Fenglin, Wangying

Jingmen

Dongbao District
Subdistricts:
Longquan Subdistrict, Quankou Subdistrict

Towns:
Lixi, Ziling, Zhanghe, Mahe, Shiqiaoyi, Pailou

The only township is Xianju Township

Duodao District
Subdistricts:
Duodao Subdistrict, Baimiao Subdistrict

Towns:
Tuanlipu, Macheng

Zhongxiang
The only subdistrict is Yingzhong Subdistrict

Towns:
Yangzi, Changshou, Fengle, Huji, Shuanghe, Linkuang, Wenji, Lengshui, Shipai, Jiukou, Chaihu, Changtan, Dongqiao, Kedian, Zhangji

The only township is Jiuli Township

Jingshan County
Towns:
Xinshi, Yongxing, Caowu, Luodian, Songhe, Pingba, Sanyang, Lülin, Yangji, Sunqiao, Shilong, Yonglong, Yanmenkou, Qianchang

Xinshi
Communities:
Yundu, Wenbifeng, Zhonggulou, Sanjiaozhou, Guihuatai, Dongguan, Chengfan, Xinyang, Fenghuangyan

Villages:
Gaochao, Wusi, Shuixiakou, Baigudong, Hongquan, Yanhao, Siling, Hehuayan, Dingjiabang, Gaoling, Xiongtan, Chenbazi, Dazhu, Tianwang, Bazimen, Shengjing, Wangjiaguai, Longquanshan, Huolong, Xiaohuanling

Yonglong
Yonglong is made up of two communities and thirty villages:

Shayang County
Towns:
Shayang Town, Wulipu, Shilipu, Jishan, Shihuiqiao, Hougang, Maoli, Guandang, Lishi, Maliang, Gaoyang, Shenji, Zengji

Wulipu
Wulipu comprises 21 village-level divisions, including two communities and nineteen villages.
 
Communities:
Wuli, Caochang

Villages:
Zhaoji, Xuchang, Shiling, Bailing, Yandian, Yangji, Hexin, Zaodian, Jintai, Liuji, Xianling, Zuozhong, Chenchi, Lianghe, Lianhe, Baihu, Huolong, Anquan, Taochang

Jingzhou

Jingzhou District
Subdistricts:
Xicheng Subdistrict, Dongcheng Subdistrict, Chengnan Subdistrict

Towns:
Jinan, Chuandian, Mashan, Balingshan, Libu, Mishi, Yingcheng

Shashi District
Subdistricts:
Zhongshan Subdistrict, Chongwen Subdistrict, Jiefang Subdistrict, Shengli Subdistrict, Chaoyang Subdistrict, Lianhe Subdistrict

Towns:
Luochang, Cenhe, Guanyindang, Guanju

The only township is Lixin Township

Honghu
Subdistricts:
Xindi Subdistrict, Binhu Subdistrict

Towns:
Luoshan, Wulin, Longkou, Yanwo, Xintan, Fengkou, Caoshi, Fuchang, Daijiachang, Qujiawan, Shakou, Wanquan, Chahe, Huangjiakou

The only township is Laowan Township

Wanquan
One community:
 Wanquan

Forty-eight villages:
Xinzhong, Hongzhong, Hongguan, Hongchun, Hongshan, Chenzhuang, Xiaohe, Tianjing, Hezui, Zheling, Gaohu, Lutan, Zhinan, Donghe, Wanquan, Wandian, Nongke, Huangsi, Wupeng, Qingming, Wangmiao, Talu, Yongfeng, Laogou, Jianshi, Quanfeng, Yangzha, Nanchang, Dongmiao, Shidang, Hongqiao, Zhengdaohu, Beiling, Nanling, Xuqiao, Hedian, Tanzi, Huagu, Bagou, C/Zhangsong, Gongxing, Zhaogou, Zhongling, Ma'an, Lifan, Zhangdang, Lu/iuyuan, Poling

Two other areas:
Wanquan, Yongfeng

Shishou
Subdistricts:
Xiulin Subdistrict, Biheshan Subdistrict

Towns:
Xinchang, Henggoushi, Dayuan, Xiaohekou, Taohuashan, Tiaoguan, Dongsheng, Gaojimiao, Nankou, Gaoling, Tuanshansi

The only township is Jiuheyuan Township

Dongsheng
Three communities:
Huajiadang, Ping'an, Jiaoshanhe

Thirty-three villages:
Tunzishan, Tongzigang, Fengshan, Tuchengyuan, Sanjiayuan, Zhuangjiapu, Chenjiapu, Changdisi, Bijiatang, Zinandi, Xindikou, Wanghai, Huayuhu, Lianghu, Huangjiatan, Yazihu, Nanhetou, Yuelianghu, Machuan, Xianzhongmiao, Dayangshu, Zoumaling, Guanluqi, Xiemamiao, Bajiaoling, Jiangjiachong, Dongjialou, Yanglin, Dongsheng, Sanheyuan, Yujiapeng, Xingangkou, Yayanqiao

Four other areas:
Yazihu, State-run Farm, Shangjinhu, Yanzhi

Songzi
Towns:
Xinjiangkou, Nanhai, Babao, Yuanshi, Laocheng, Chendian, Wangjiaqiao, Sijiachang, Yanglinshi, Zhichanghe, Jieheshi, Weishui, Liujiachang, Shadaoguan

Townships:
Wanjia Township, Xiejiaping Tujia Ethnic Township

Gong'an County
Towns:
Buhe, Douhudi, Jiazhuyuan, Zhakou, Yangjiachang, Mahaokou, Ouchi, Huangshantou, Mengjiaxi, Nanping, Zhangzhuangpu, Shizikou, Banzhudang, Maojiagang

Townships:
Ganjiachang Township, Zhangtiansi Township

Jiangling County
Towns:
Zishi, Tanqiao, Xionghe, Baimasi, Shagang, Puji, Haoxue

Townships:
Majiazhai Township, Qinshi Township

Jianli County
Towns:
Rongcheng, Zhuhe, Xingou, Gongchang, Zhoulaozui, Huangxiekou, Wangqiao, Chengji, Fenyan, Maoshi, Futiansi, Shangchewan, Bianhe, Chiba, Bailuo, Wangshi, Sanzhou, Qiaoshi

Townships:
Hongcheng Township, Qipan Township, Zhemu Township

Wangshi
Two residential communities:
Wangshi, Beikou

Twenty-three villages:
Xiaotan, Gaoqiao, Batou, Sanguan, Gaomiao, Gumiao, Hengdi, Jianxin, Beikou, Tiemiao, Yushi, Nianqiao, Wangshi, Xinlu, Zhoutai, Miaolu, Sansheng, Tiezui, Minglu, Datan, Liulian, Liuwang, Xinshan/sha

Qianjiang

Six subdistricts:
Yuanlin Subdistrict, Yangshi Subdistrict, Zhouji Subdistrict, Guanghua Subdistrict, Taifeng Subdistrict, Gaochang Subdistrict

Ten towns:
Zhugentan, Yuyang, Wangchang, Gaoshibei, Xiongkou, Laoxin, Haokou, Jiyukou, Zhangjin, Longwan

Other areas:
Qianjiang Development Zone/Zekou Subdistrict, Bailuhu Administrative Area, Zongkou Administrative Area, Xiongkou Farm Administrative Area, Yunlianghu Administrative Area, Houhu Administrative Area, Zhouji Administrative Area, Jianghan Oil Administrative Area

Shennongjia

Towns:
Songbai, Yangri, Muyu, Hongping, Xinhua

Townships:
Songluo Township, Jiuhu Township, Xiaguping Tujia Ethnic Township

Muyu
Residential communities:
 Muyuping, Honghuaping, Xiangxiyuan

Villages:
 Honghuaping, Sanduihe, Laojunshan, Chaoshuihe, Qingfeng, Shennongtan, Muyu, Qingtian

Xinhua
Residential communities:
 Zhangshuping

Villages:
 Longkou, Longtan, Gaobaiyan, Taoping, Maluchang, Daling, Mao'erguan, Shiwotou, Bao'erdong

Shiyan

Maojian District
Subdistricts:
Wudang Road Subdistrict, Eryan Subdistrict, Wuyan Subdistrict, Bailang Subdistrict

The only town is Dachuan

Townships:
Xiaochuan Township, Maota Township, Yuanyang Township

Zhangwan District
Subdistricts:
Huaguo Subdistrict, Hongwei Subdistrict, Checheng Road Subdistrict, Hanjiang Road Subdistrict

Towns:
Huanglong, Bailin

Townships:
Fangtan Township, Xigou Township

Danjiangkou
Subdistricts:
Junzhou Road Subdistrict, Daba Road Subdistrict, Danzhao Road Subdistrict, Sanguandian Subdistrict

Towns:
Daguanya, Langhe, Dingjiaying, Liuliping, Yanchihe, Junxian, Xijiadian, Haoping, Shigu, Liangshuihe, Guanshan

The only township is Tutai Township

Fang County
Towns:
Chengguan, Jundian, Hualongyan, Tucheng, Damuchang, Qingfeng, Mengusi, Baihe, Yerengu, Hongta, Yaohuai

Townships:
Yaoping Township, Langkou Township, Shahe Township, Wanguhe Township, Shangkan Township, Zhongba Township, Jiudao Township, Huilong Township

Huilong Township
Villages:
 Shisan, Hongxing, Hongwei, Ershi(), Hongqi, Heizhanggou, Guqiaogou

Yun County
Towns:
Chengguan, Anyang, Yangxipu, Qingqu, Baisangguan, Nanhuatang, Bailang, Liudong, Tanshan, Meipu, Qingshan, Liubei, Baoxia, Hujiaying, Tanjiawan

Townships:
Daliu Township, Wufeng Township, Yeda Township

Daliu Township
Twelve villages:
 Yangjia, Shizigou, Jintang, Zuoxisi, Huanglongmiao, Songshuwan, Daliushu, Yuliang, Huajiahe, Gangzigou, Shuangping, Baiquan

Yunxi County
Towns:
Chengguan, Tumen, Shangjin, Dianzi, Jiahe, Yangwei, Guanyin, Ma'an, Hejia

Townships:
Xiangkou Township, Guanfang Township, Hubeikou Hui Ethnic Township, Jingyang Township, Liulang Township, Jianchi Township, Anjia Township, Huaishulin Township, Sanguandong Township

Zhushan County
Towns:
Chengguan, Yishui, Majiadu, Baofeng, Leigu, Qingu, Desheng, Tianjia, Guandu

Townships:
Pankou Township, Zhuping Township, Damiao Township, Shuangtai Township, Loutai Township, Wenfeng Township, Shenhe Township, Liulin Township, Duheyuan Township

Zhuxi County
Towns:
Chengguan, Jiangjiayan, Zhongfeng, Shuiping, Xianhe, Quanxi, Fengxi, Zhuxi, Longba

Townships:
Xinzhou Township, Bingying Township, Eping Township, Huiwan Township, Tianbao Township, Taoyuan Township, Xiangba Township

Suizhou

Zengdu District
Subdistricts:
Xicheng Subdistrict, Dongcheng Subdistrict, Nanjiao Subdistrict, Beijiao Subdistrict, Chengnan New Area Subdistrict

Towns:
Wandian, Hedian, Luoyang, Fuhe, Xihe

Guangshui
Subdistricts:
Yingshan Subdistrict, Shili Subdistrict, Guangshui Subdistrict

Towns:
Wushengguan, Yangzhai, Chenxiang, Changling, Maping, Guanmiao, Yudian, Wudian, Haodian, Caihe

Townshisp:
Chengjiao Township, Lidian Township, Taiping Township, Luodian Township

Wudian
One community:
Dongmenlou

Fourteen villages:
Shuangxiang, Quankou, Louziwan, Shuanggang, Donghe, Wangzidian, Zhongxin, Dongwan, Yangjia'ao, Zhimawan, Jiangxidian, Santumen, Tangfan, Xujiashan

Sui County
Towns:
Lishan, Gaocheng, Yindian, Caodian, Xiaolin, Huaihe, Wanhe, Shangshi, Tangxian, Wushan, Xinjie, Anju, Huantan, Hongshan, Changgang, Sanligang, Liulin, Junchuan, Wanfudian

Gaocheng
One community:
Gaocheng

Thirteen villages:
Daqiao, Longwangmiao, Meizigou, Leijiaci, Qilita, Xinwu, Sanqingguan, Luojiaqiao, Qianjin, Xiejiadian, Qigudian, Songduo, Gaohuang

Tianmen

Subdistricts:
Jingling Subdistrict, Qiaoxiang Subdistrict Development Zone, Yanglin Subdistrict

Towns:
Duobao, Tuoshi, Zhanggang, Jiangchang, Wangchang, Yuxin, Huangtan, Yuekou, Henglin, Pengshi, Mayang, Duoxiang, Ganyi, Mawan, Lushi, Xiaoban, Jiuzhen, Zaoshi, Hushi, Shijiahe, Fozishan

The only township is Jingtan Township

Other Areas:
Tianmen Industrial Park, Jianghu Farm, Baimaohu Farm, Chenhu Committee

Mawan
One community:
Mawan

Twenty-five villages:
Machang, Chenma, Luwan, Zouwan, Zhengwan, Bianhekou, Litan, Yangang, Zhawu, Hengdi, Nanzha, Zhangwan, Chenhuang, Liaowan, Jianghu, Zengliu, Guozui, Datai, Wangchen, Hedi, Xiaohu, Kuangtai, Tukeng, Chendu, Chengang

Xiangyang

Fancheng District
Subdistricts:
Hanjiang Subdistrict, Wangzhai Subdistrict, Zhongyuan Subdistrict, Dingzhongmen Subdistrict, Qinghekou Subdistrict, Pingxiangmen Subdistrict, Migong Subdistrict, Shipu Subdistrict, Zizhen Subdistrict, Qilihe Subdistrict, Dongfeng Subdistrict

Towns:
Niushou, Taipingdian, Tuanshan, Mizhuang

Xiangcheng District
Subdistricts:
Wangfu Subdistrict, Zhaoming Subdistrict, Panggong Subdistrict, Tanxi Subdistrict, Longzhong Subdistrict, Yujiahu Subdistrict

Towns:
Oumiao, Wolong

The only township is Yinji Township

Xiangzhou District
Subdistricts:
Zhangwan Subdistrict, Liuji Subdistrict

Towns:
Longwang, Shiqiao, Huangji, Huopai, Guyi, Zhuji, Chenghe, Shuanggou, Zhangjiaji, Huanglong, Yushan, Dongjin

Dongjin
Villages:
 Shangying, Qixiang, Dongjin, Fanying, Fanpo, Chenpo, Yishe, Ershe, Shangzhou, Zhongzhou, Xiazhou, Wangzhai, Sanhe, Liwan, Qiangang, Hougang, Weili, Zhuangchong, Chunhe, Tangchong, Qinzui, Tianchong, Pengzhuang, Yanpo, Zhouzhai, Zhupeng, Tanwan, Cuihu, Xiaogang, Yuegang, Tangdian, Sunwangying, Liudian, Houying, Shenying, Zhonglou, Yingkou, Fuzhai, Wuwan, Heli, Lüzhai, Xiaoying, Tangzhuang, Yuedi, Magang, Liugou, Zhengwan, Dahuo, Qili, Zhangzui, Zhuying, Jianpo

Laohekou
Subdistricts:
Guanghua Subdistrict, Zanyang Subdistrict

Towns:
Menglou, Zhulinqiao, Xueji, Zhangji, Xianrendu, Hongshanzui, Lilou

The only township is Yuanchong Township

Yicheng
Subdistricts:
Yancheng Subdistrict, Nanying Subdistrict

Towns:
Zhengji, Xiaohe, Liuhou, Kongwan, Liushui, Banqiao, Wangji, Leihe

Zaoyang
Subdistricts:
Beicheng Subdistrict, Nancheng Subdistrict, Huancheng Subdistrict

Towns:
Juwan, Qifang, Yangdang, Taiping, Xinshi, Lutou, Liusheng, Xinglong, Wangcheng, Wudian, Xiongji, Pinglin

Xinshi
Communities:
Xinshi, Qiangang

Villages:
Xinyi, Qianjing, Lilou, Hongyanhe, Dayan, Luolou, Dongliwan, Xiepeng, Zhaozhuang, Zhangxiang, Xiaozhuang, Luohebei, Huangwan, Pengzhuang, Huoqing, Xingchuan, Zhoulou, Qianwan, Zhengjiawan, Fujiawan, Mengziping, Tanghe, Xinji, Luozhuang, Qiangangyi, Qiangang'er, Wanglaozhuang, Qiandang, Xionggang, Wangdaqiao, Xiliwang, Gaoya, Shantouli, Dengpeng, Yaopeng, Bailu, Yangzhuang, Rengang, Quangou

Wudian
Communities:
Zhongxin, Qingtan

Villages:
Xinzhuang, Chunling, Yaogang, Xizhaohu, Shengmiao, Erlang, Xiaowan, Zhouzhai, Huangmiao, Dongzhaohu, Shutou, Gunhe, Lizhai, Tongxin, Huangcun, Shilou, Wukou, Shenfan, Baima, Gaofeng, Dazi, Xulou, Baishui, Tiantai, Liangshui, Tangwan, Chaijiamiao, Dongchong, Jiangfan, Yuzui, Shuangcaomen, Sanligang, Xuzhai, Chengwan, Shuangwan, Jingwan, Qiganwan, Changligang, Dayanjiao, Yuhuangmiao, Hewan, Huawuji, Shici, Yufan

Baokang County
Towns:
Chengguan, Huangbao, Houping, Longping, Dianya, Maliang, Xiema, Maqiao, Siping, Guoduwan

The only township is Lianggu Township

Gucheng County
Towns:
Chengguan, Shihua, Shengkang, Miaotan, Wushan, Cihe, Nanhe, Zijin, Lengji

The only township is Zhaowan Township

Shihua
Eight residential communities:
 Dongmenjie, Xihejie, Shixijie, Cangtaijie, Houfan, Minyingjingjiqu, Dayuqiaojie, Laojuntai

Thirty-eight villages:
 Jiepaiya, Hongmamiao, Tiemiaogou, Huangjiaying, Pingchuan, Peijiaqiao, Gongjiawan, Yangxiwan, Shuixingtai, Xiaxindian, Zhoujiawan, Shijiawan, Pengjiawan, Caijiaying, Gaojiachong, Dayu, Shaojialou, Doupodian, Biaojiamiao, Tuqiaogou, Tongbeimiao, Yinfan, Liangshuijing, Pengjialing, Xijiaya, Wujiazhou, Yanwan, Cangyu, Baijiayan, Tongshan, Cuihuapu, Jiangjunshan, Yangjiahu, Xiaotanshan, Chenjialou, Longjiagou, Longwan

Nanzhang County
Towns:
Chengguan, Wu'an, Jiuji, Limiao, Changping, Xueping, Banqiao, Xunjian, Donggong, Xiaoyan

Xianning

Xian'an District
Subdistricts:
Wenquan Subdistrict, Fushan Subdistrict, Yong'an Subdistrict

Towns:
Tingsiqiao, Xiangyanghu, Guanbuqiao, Henggouqiao, Heshengqiao, Shuangxiqiao, Maqiao, Guihua, Gaoqiao

The only township is Damu Township

Chibi City
Subdistricts:
Puqi Subdistrict, Chimagang Subdistrict, Lushuihu Subdistrict

Towns:
Xindian, Zhaoliqiao, Cha'anling, Chebu, Chibi Town, Liushanhu, Shenshan, Zhonghuopu, Guantangyi, Huangshanhu

The only township is Yujiaqiao Township

Chongyang County
Towns:
Tiancheng, Shaping, Shicheng, Guihuaquan, Baini, Lukou, Jintang, Qingshan

Townships:
Xiaoling Township, Tongzhong Township, Gangkou Township, Gaojian Township

Xiaoling
Ten villages:
金不村, 泉陂村, 台山村, 大堰村, 霞星村, 肖岭村, 白马村, 三角村, 星桥村, 锁石村

Jiayu County
Towns:
Luxi, Gaotieling, Guanqiao, Yuyue, Xinjie, Dupu, Panjiawan, Paizhouwan

Tongcheng County
Towns:
Junshui, Maishi, Tanghu, Guandao, Shadui, Wuli, Shinan, Beigang, Magang

Townships:
Sizhuang Township, Daping Township

Juanshui
Eight communities:
Yanta 雁塔, Yincheng 银城, Xinta 新塔, Xuhong 旭红, Xianghan 湘汉, Heping 和平, Xiushui 秀水, Baisha 白沙

Eleven villages:
Baota 宝塔, Donggang 东港, Taoyuan 桃源, Gulong 古龙, Liuluan 柳峦, Shiquan 石泉, Tiezhu 铁柱, Youfang 油坊, Lihe 利和, Shangkuo 上阔, Xiakuo下阔

Tongshan County
Towns:
Tongyang, Nanlinqiao, Huangshapu, Xiapu, Jiugongshan, Chuangwang, Honggang, Dafan

Townships:
Dalu Township, Yangfanglin Township, Yanxia Township, Cikou Township

Nanlinqiao
Communities & villages: 南林桥, 大坪, 石垅, 青垱, 石门, 湄溪, 罗城, 湄港, 雨山, 南林, 港路, 高桥, 团墩12个行政村和1个街道社区.

Xiantao

Subdistricts:
Shazui Subdistrict, Ganhe Subdistrict, Longhuashan Subdistrict

Towns:
Zhengchang, Maozui, Louhe, Sanfutan, Huchang, Changtangkou, Xiliuhe, Shahu, Yanglinwei, Pengchang, Zhanggou, Guohe, Miancheng Hui Town, Tonghaikou, Chenchang

Other Areas:
Xiantao Industrial Park, Jiuheyuan, Shahu, Paihu Paihu Scenic Area, Wuhu Fishery, Zhaoxiyuan Forestry Area, Liujiayuan Forestry Area, Chuqinliang Seed Stock Station

Xiaogan

Xiaonan District
Four subdistricts:
Shuyuan Subdistrict, Xinhua Subdistrict, Guangchang Subdistrict, Chezhan Subdistrict

Eight towns:
Xinpu, Xihe, Yangdian, Dougang, Xiaogang, Maochen, Sancha, Zhuzhan

Three townships:
Pengxing Township, Wolong Township, Minji Township

Six other areas:
Xiaonan Economic Development Area, Zhuhu Farm, Dongshantou Seed Stock Farm, Danyang Management Office, Xiaotian Management Office, Huaiyin Management Office

Shuyuan Subdistrict
Communities:
Shuyuan, Beiwai, Beichi, Xihuqiao, Xiangyang, Chengxi, Houhu, Wangyao, Jinxiu, Yongxin

Villages:
Guangming, Jimiao

Xinhua Subdistrict
Communities:
Fuqian, Zhongshan, Meiningguan, Yanhe, Yuji, Wenchangge, Wanfu, Nanqiao, Shagou, Liancheng, Dukou, Sugala

Chezhan Subdistrict (Xiaonan)
Communities:
Chezhan, Liming, Zhengge, Minzhu Shengli, Hongcheng

Anlu
Subdistricts:
Fucheng Subdistrict, Nancheng Subdistrict

Towns:
Zhaopeng, Lidian, Xundian, Tangdi, Leigong, Wangyizhen, Yandian, Bofan, Fushui

Townships:
Chendian Township, Xinzha Township, Muzi Township, Jieguan Township

Yandian
Four communities:
Yuanfan, Yuzhai, Songlong, and Baidian
 
Thirty-six villages:
Yandian, Bishan, Zhouqiao, Shuizhai, Shuangling, Baishu, Chalu, Ligang (李岗村 Jianshan, Feigang, Xiaowan, Changgang, Zhouci, Huangpeng, Guanyan, Zhanggang, Zhouchong, Liwan, Tianwan, Chengxiang, Gonggang, Wanqiao, Wanggang, Shuangmiao, Denghe, Denggang, Huanglu, Dongqiao, Shihe, Zhuluo, Fengmiao, Yaozha, Huangzha, Dengchong, Balicun, and Pengqiao

Bofan
The town is made up of 3 subdistricts and 14 villages including Bofan Community.

Hanchuan
The only subdistrict is Xiannüshan Subdistrict

Towns:
Makou, Maiwang, Chenghuang, Fenshui, Chenhu, Tian'erhe, Huilong, Xinyan, Tongzhong, Mahe, Liujiage, Xinhe, Miaotou, Yanglingou

Townships:
Xijiang Township, Wantan Township, Nanhe Township, Ma'an Township, Litan Township, Hanji Township

Xiannüshan
17 Communities:
Xiannüshan 仙女山社区, Zoumaling 走马岭社区, Huanlejie 欢乐街社区, Xianrenwei 仙人位社区, Xihulu 西湖路社区, Bengzhanhe 泵站河社区, Guanbeitang 官备塘社区, Xiangjiayuan 向家垸社区, Huohoushan 火猴山社区, Shanhouwan 山后湾社区, Ximenqiao 西门桥社区, Luheyuan 六合垸社区, Guangchanglu 广场路社区, Huochengtai 霍城台社区, Xianghehuayuan 祥和花园社区, Beiqiao 北桥社区, Fuxing 福星社区

6 Villages:
Qili 七里村, Guoguang 国光村, Huayi 华一村, Hua'er 华二村, Gangdi 港堤村, Liujiatai 刘家台村

Huilong
One community:
 Huilong Community

Nineteen villages:
 Yangzhan, Sanyuan, Lutai, Dumiao, Chikou, Chapeng, Xinqiao, Huilong, Jinjiahui, Tangwan, Wangyuan, Yuhuangge, Guihuashu, Junyuan, Wangyang, Machengtai, Luosi, Zaogang, Chenyuan

Yingcheng
Subdistricts:
Chengzhong Subdistrict, Chengbei Subdistrict, Silipeng Subdistrict, Dongmafang Subdistrict, Changjiangbu Subdistrict

Towns:
Tiandian, Yanghe, Sanhe, Langjun, Huangtan, Tian'e, Yihe, Chenhe, Yangling, Tangchi

Chengzhong
Twelve communities:
Yueyuan, Wangjiatai, Sanyanjing, Guchengtai, Nianwu, Guangming, Gucheng, Gongnonglu, Xinhe, Changhu, Xingxing, Chuntianmingyuan

Four villages:
Fanhe, Baofeng, Guoguang, Zhouchen

Chengbei
Communities:
Qixingqiao, Gaodujie, Xinjianjie, Zhaofan

Villages:
Changyan, Jiangxiang, Beishi, Wanqiao, Yangfan, C/Shengtan, Wulou, Gaoqiao, Sunyan, Fugang, Hanwan, Douhe, Zouguo, Liulin, Weihe, Xiaoliao, Niepo, Songpo, Lizui, Leishan, Wangmiao, Rehuo, Gonghe, Daihe, Xuhuang, Baima, Baiyang, Jidun, Hongtang, Xishi, Chapeng, Xingguang

Silipeng
Three communities:
Pudong, Yankuang, Liuyang

Thirteen villages:
Datian, Zhangyang, Xiaxin, Xiehe, Siyang, Fuxing, Huashan, Dongshi, Aimiao, Lishu, Sunxiong, Guanghui, Sanjiang

Sanhe
Villages:
Sanhe, Huali, Lutai, Gaolu, Tianjing, Tumen, Duimian, Shuangdun, Yihe, Caoyang, Bapeng, Yaogeng, Sanjie, Yuechi, Liufen, Lizhai, Weida, Xitou, Chenyuan, Liuhu, Maochong, Xuzhou, Xuliu, Yuzhang, Tuhuang, Zhouyang, Wushan, Lianghe, Zhangwang, Shuangqiao, Gaoxu, Xudun, Tangxiang

Dawu County
Towns:
Chengguan, Yangping, Fangfan, Xincheng, Xiadian, Liuji, Hekou, Sigu, Lüwang, Huangzhan, Xuanhuadian, Fengdian, Daxin, Sanli

Townships:
Gaodian Township, Pengdian Township, Dongxin Township

Liuji
One community:
Liuji

Fifteen villages:
Jinhe, Jingu, Dading, Kuaigang (or Huigang), Tiezhai, Heshan, Diangang, Liuji, Lanchong, Magang, Shahe, Wangsi, Changchong, Jianshe, Liupeng

Xiaochang County
Towns:
Huayuan, Fengshan, Zhouxiang, Xiaohe, Wangdian, Weidian, Baisha, Zougang

Townships:
Xiaowu Township, Jidian Township, Huaxi Township, Doushan Township

Yunmeng County
Towns:
Chengguan, Yitang, Zengdian, Wupu, Wuluo, Xiaxindian, Daoqiao, Geputan, Hujindian

Townships:
Daodian Township, Shahe Township, Qingminghe Township

Yichang

Dianjun District
The only subdistrict is Dianjun Subdistrict

Towns:
Aijia, Qiaobian

Townships:
Lianpeng Township, Tucheng Township

Wujiagang District
Subdistricts:
Dagongqiao Subdistrict, Wanshouqiao Subdistrict, Baotahe Subdistrict, Wujiagang Subdistrict

The only township is Wujia Township

Xiling District
Subdistricts:
Xiling Subdistrict, Xueyuan Subdistrict, Yunji Subdistrict, Xiba Subdistrict, Gezhouba Subdistrict, Yemingzhu Subdistrict, Development Zone Subdistrict

The only township is Wowan Township

Xiaoting District
Subdistricts:
Gulaobei Subdistrict, Huya Subdistrict, Yunchi Subdistrict

Yiling District
Subdistricts:
Xiaoxita Subdistrict, Yiling Economic Development Zone Subdistrict

Towns:
Zhangcunping, Wuduhe, Fenxiang, Taipingxi, Sandouping, Letianxi, Longquan, Yaqueling

Townships:
Xiabaoping Township, Dengcun Township, Huanghua Township

Taipingxi
One residential community:
 Wuxiangmiao

Twelve villages:
 Xujiachong, Luofo, Longtanping, Fuchengping, Linjiaxi, Meirentuo, Xiaoxikou, Hanjiawan, Taipingxi, Changling, Huangjiachong, Gucunping

Sandouping
One residential community:
 Sandouping

Nineteen villages:
 Huanglingmiao, Huangniuyan, Nantuo, Yuanyi, Qipanshan, Zhongbao/bu/pu, Gaojiachong, Shiban, Qiuqianping, Huajipo, Dongyuemiao, Xinsheng, Shipai, Tianqiao, Zhemuping, Wuhe, Toudingshi, Muyang, Baiguotang

Dangyang
Subdistricts:
Yuyang Subdistrict, Baling Subdistrict, Yuquan Subdistrict

Towns:
Lianghe, Herong, Yuxi, Miaoqian, Wangdian, Banyue, Caobuhu

Yidu
The only subdistrict is Lucheng Subdistrict

Towns:
Honghuatao, Gaobazhou, Niejiahe, Songmuping, Zhicheng, Yaojiadian, Wuyanquan

Townships:
Panjiawan Tujia Ethnic Township, Wangjiafan Township

Lucheng Subdistrict
Ten residential communities:
 Dongfeng, Shengli, Qingjiang, Mingdu, Jiefang, Hongchun, Zhongbi, Toubi, Baziqiao, Jinjiang

Nine villages:
 Liangjianao, Taibaohu, Yimachong, Chejiadian, Weibi, Shilipu, Sanjiang, Baotawan, Longwo

Zhicheng
Four residential communities:
 Jiefanglu, Datong, Yangxi, Xihu

Twenty-eight villages:
 Jiaguoshan, Lijiaping, Shuijingping, Zhifangchong, Liulichong, Zhongjiachong, Yangxi, Heyangdian, Huilongdang, Guandang, Guanping, Wufengshan, Baishuigang, Sanbanhu, Jiudaohe, Dayan, Yujiaqiao, Quanshuihe, Chixihe, Quanxinfan, Yangjinfan, Yanjiang, Huancheng, Yangheling, Xiejiachong, Louzihe, Liangjiafan, Longwangtai

Zhijiang
The only subdistrict is Majiadian Subdistrict

Towns:

Changyang Tujia Autonomous County
Towns:
Longzhouping, Gaojiayan, Moshi, Duzhenwan, Ziqiu, Yuxiakou, Langping, Hejiaping

Townships:
Dayan Township, Yazikou Township, Huoshaoping Township

Wufeng Tujia Autonomous County
Towns:
Wufeng, Changleping, Yuyangguan, Renheping, Wantan

Townships:
Fujiayan Township, Niuzhuang Township, Caihua Township

Xingshan County
Towns:
Gufu, Zhaojun, Xiakou, Nanyang, Huangliang, Shuiyuesi

Townships:
Gaoqiao Township, Bangzi Township

Yuan'an County
Towns:
Mingfeng, Hualinsi, Jiuxian, Yangping, Maopingchang, Hehua

The only township is Hekou Township

Zigui County
Towns:

Townships:
Shuitianba Township, Xietan Township, Meijiahe Township, Moping Township

Maoping
Four residential communities:
 Binhu, Xichu, Jusong, Danyang

Eighteen villages:
 Jingangcheng, Yinxingtuo, Changling, Chenjiachong, Jiuli, Yangguidian, Chenjiaba, Jiandong, Xikouping, Sixi, Qiaojiaping, Huaguoyuan, Yueliangbao, Luojia, Songshu'ao, Zhongbazi, Lanlingxi, Miaohe

References

 
Hubei
Villages